Suzanne Christine Crowshaw (born 29 September 1981), known as Suzanne Shaw, is an English actress, singer and television personality, who rose to fame after winning the talent contest Popstars and subsequently being a member of the band Hear'Say.

Shaw is now an established musical theatre and West End performer, actress, model and television presenter in her own right. She won the third series of the ITV skating show Dancing on Ice in 2008 and participated in the 'All Stars' series in 2014.

Shaw played the character of Eve Jenson in the soap opera Emmerdale.

Early life
At the age of two, Shaw started ballet and tap classes at the Janet Lomas School of Dancing in Bury. While training at the school, she took exams in ballet, tap and modern. She also performed in annual shows and competed successfully in dance festivals and competitions across the North West. At five years of age, Shaw performed in her first amateur dramatics show, Annie. Shaw developed a love for theatre, performing in various amateur dramatic productions, including The Sound of Music and a West End production of Showboat at the age of nine. Shaw went on to train at Freelance Dance School (formerly Lupino School of Dancing). She was a member of an ABBA tribute band, The Right Stuff, and appeared in television roles including an Esso advertisement, Holby City, and a BBC production, Elidor. She also tried for the part of Maria Sutherland in Coronation Street, and made it to the final three along with Girls Aloud member Kimberley Walsh, but lost out to Samia Smith.

Shaw also developed her musical abilities, learning the recorder and violin, at St. Mary's primary school and later the saxophone at St. Gabriel's R.C. High School. After leaving school, she attended Oldham College for a BTec National Diploma in Performing Arts with extra units in acting essentials and devising and developing performance.

Popstars
Shaw's break came in 2000 when the ITV show Popstars launched a competition for contestants to become part of a newly formed pop band. Shaw had just turned 18, and attended the auditions and successfully made it through several elimination rounds. She was chosen as one of the ten finalists and became one of the members of Hear'Say, along with Kym Marsh, Myleene Klass, Noel Sullivan and Danny Foster, having beaten 4,000 other hopefuls.
Their debut single was the fastest selling non-charitable record ever in the UK, selling 1.3 million copies. Their first album, Popstars, went on to sell 1.2 million copies in the UK, followed by their own television show entitled Hear'say It's Saturday, performing with established artists such as Lionel Richie, Joe Pasquale, Bradley Walsh, Blue and Atomic Kitten.

Subsequently, the band achieved a sell-out arena tour and performed numerous television guest appearances. They released their second album Everybody for the Christmas market in 2001.

Shaw made many appearances with the band on TV and in live performance venues, including "Hear'Say: A New Chapter in Full", "The Hear'Say Story", "Hear'Say It's Saturday!" and the "Royal Variety Performance" for television.
Hear'say had two number one singles, a number three single and a number six single in the British charts as well as many awards and accolades, before splitting in 2002.

Post Hear'Say
Since the band broke up on 1 October 2002, just after her 21st birthday, Shaw has established herself as a leading lady in musical theatre as well as an actress, television presenter, model and as a popular media personality.

Musicals
Shaw has appeared in musical theatre from a young age but following the break-up of Hear'Say has begun to firmly establish herself as a leading musical theatre actress.

She landed a role in the remake of the Summer Holiday musical in London's West End, and later in a UK tour of the show starring alongside Darren Day and Christopher Biggins. Despite initial scepticism about the part going to a popstar Shaw received huge praise for the role such as from the British Theatre Guide which stated "And those who, like me, only know Suzanne Shaw (Bobby) as part of the manufactured pop group Hear'Say, had their eyes opened. She was a dancer, singer and actress long before Popstars, and it shows". and Nowt2do.com stating "Suzanne Shaw no doubt had the most to prove as Barbara, having come from Hear'Say but she has wowed this critic over. She light up the stage with her stunning smile and had the most powerful voice. It's hard to think that she was in Hear'Say when she was strutting her stuff with such professionalism that you would think she has been in West End Musicals for years. A real killer and big voice mixed with some superb dancing skills showed that Suzanne was the pure and simple choice for the role...sorry couldn't resist!".

In February 2005, Shaw took on the role of narrator in Joseph and the Amazing Technicolor Dreamcoat, also in the West End. The leading role in Snow White followed, and then as Janet in The Rocky Horror Show national tour, appearing twice on Londons West End. Shaw once again received rave reviews for her role from fans of the show, critics as well as creator Richard O' Brien. The Stage commented that Shaw was "a delectably wide-eyed Janet", with Critic Chris High stating "Shaw is delightful as the naive Janet and proves she has far more to offer than anything a reality TV show could ever uncover" and the British Theatre guide stating "A big surprise to me was how outstanding former Hear'Say popstar Suzanne Shaw was: she is so at home on stage with strong voice and fabulous presence". Shaw has also appeared in the musicals Chicago and White Christmas; for further details see notable roles and appearances.

Television
Acting roles post Hear'say have included The Court for Channel Four and a guest appearance on the British television police procedural The Bill, broadcast on ITV1 in June 2007, playing the character of Laura Matthews.
Shaw has been a panellist for Loose Women on ITV1 as well as appearing in the reality television programmes Have I Been Here Before? and Britain's Worst Celebrity Driver and the popular ITV show Dancing on Ice.

Media
Shaw is the face and body of the Michelle for George Ultimo range at Asda. In 2008, Shaw wrote a weekly column for Woman Magazine which has a circulation of over 370,000 each week.
Shaw is also an ambassador of Mattel and the deal with Shaw is the first time that Mattel and Barbie DVD distributor Entertainment Rights have undertaken together. Shaw lent her vocals to the theme tune "Connected" from 2008's "Barbie(TM) and the Diamond Castle" children's movie.
Shaw has brought out a successful perfume "Ice" and interactive family DVD "Suzanne Shaw's Showtime Showdown".
She is current face of Tesco Mobile as well as Disney for which she has launched the interactive games "Disney's Sing It" and "Disney's A Christmas Carol".

Music
Shaw recorded a song entitled "Calling" for dance duo Koishii & Hush which was a hit in dance charts both in the UK and the US. She also co-wrote several tracks for Hear'Say one of which was also recorded by and featured on the second album of American pop group Jump 5.

Presenting
Shaw presented a live gameshow Bingolotto on Virgin 1 and Challenge every Friday night.

Pantomime
Shaw took the title role of Cinderella, at the Bristol Hippodrome for the 2013 Christmas period. In the 2021 Christmas period Shaw played Belle in Beauty and the Beast at Chesterfield's Pomegranate Theatre.

Notable roles and appearances

Dancing on Ice 
In 2008, Shaw won series 3 of the popular ITV show Dancing on Ice, performing technical footwork and solo skating skills as well as many lifts and tricks with her partner Matt Evers, the "Headbanger" being her most best-known of the series (recreated with the twister in her final performance). Bonnie Langford was the first celebrity to perform the 'Headbanger' move in series 1, albeit from a lying position. Shaw is the only celebrity ever to do the Headbanger from a standing takeoff position, which is more difficult and more dangerous. Shaw also remains the only female celebrity to do the twister in the headbanger, the splits lift, the ballet lift, the walk over, a 3 jump, the famous Torvill and Dean overhead flip and cartwheel and a full death spiral amongst other moves.

On 1 March 2008, it was confirmed that she had chipped a bone in her ankle during training and there were doubts as to whether she would be able to continue in the competition. Having previously received a gash to the head and a broken rib, this did not deter her, and she vowed to carry on for her dance partner and the people who had voted for her. On 2 March, she skated with her ankle strapped and finished second from bottom on the leader board with a total of 24; however, the public saved her from the skate-off.

On 9 March, she skated in the semi-final of Dancing on Ice and again achieved the highest score of the series so far with 27.5 (it also being the score of her "Music" routine) to the song "Eternal Flame". Christopher Dean stated that he was hugely impressed with her skating and performance, saying she could do both fast and slower numbers equally well and was exceptionally versatile. He also revealed that Shaw was very good at improvising as she forgot some of the steps at the start of the routine.

On 16 March, Suzanne Shaw was named the Series 3 Dancing on Ice champion, after Phillip Schofield announced she had won the public vote. She skated three times during the series finale, scoring a flawless five sixes with the judges in two of her routines. No contestant on Dancing on Ice had ever received five sixes before. She then went on to win the show by getting the majority of the public votes.

She also took part in related competitions, including the Tour and Christmas Special with Team Torvill. In the Christmas special Shaw again received the maximum score of 30 for her performance of the Santa Baby effectively winning the show for team Torvill. She still holds the record for being the only celebrity to have 3 perfect scores in a row.

Shaw wowed crowds in her second dancing on ice tour in April despite having to adjust to a new partner. Christopher Dean praised Shaw stating that she had "done wonders" despite less than 3 weeks training with her new partner prior to the tour. Shaw also received high praise from the judges as well as Torvill and Dean for being "an absolute professional" regarding the change of partners.

The Baron
In 2007, Shaw filmed a reality TV show named The Baron. It was due to air in autumn 2007, but following the death of her co-star Mike Reid in July of that year, it was postponed until April 2008. The series featured Shaw, Sex Pistols manager Malcolm McLaren and Mike Reid competing for a vacant Baronial title in a small Scottish town called Gardenstown, near Banff in Aberdeenshire.

During the filming, McLaren was thrown out of the village for unruly behaviour, leaving Reid and Shaw to contest the final election, which was won by Reid. Before his death, Reid had expressed a wish to have a new community centre built in the village; a number of donations have since been secured from his family and others, and this is likely to go ahead in the near future.

The show premièred on 24 April 2008 on ITV and attracted good viewing figures for the 3 episodes for its 10:35 pm timeslot.

Chicago
After her success on Dancing on Ice, Shaw joined the West End cast of Chicago. Shaw was originally only due to play the role of Roxie Hart for 6 weeks but due to good reviews and several standing ovations (Daily Mail) her contract was extended until August 2008.
Shaw received a nomination for best takeover in the prestigious whatsonstage theatregoers choice awards for her performance of the role. It is rumoured that Shaw was offered the role again on the West End and in a national tour in 2009 but decided to reprise her role in the Dancing on Ice Tour as she is 2008 Champion.

The Vagina Monologues
Shaw toured in The Vagina Monologues throughout the summer of 2009 alongside actresses such as Jessie Wallace, Wendi Peters and Sue Holderness. This is the second time Shaw has appeared in the production; her previous appearance was in Brighton in 2007.

White Christmas
Shaw starred as Judy Haynes alongside Aled Jones, Adam Cooper and Roy Dotrice in the musical White Christmas at the Lowry arts centre in Salford from November 2009 to January 2010. She received very positive reviews for the role from, for example, The Stage, which commented "The beautiful Haynes Sisters are delightfully played by Suzanne Shaw as Judy, who sings and dances with ease with talented Rachel Stanley as her sister Betty", The Lancashire Evening Post which stated "Former Hearsay star, Suzanne Shaw is a revelation, dancing, singing and acting with seasoned aplomb". and the Flintshire Chronicle which said "The show played to the actors' strengths so (Aled) Jones and (Rachel) Stanley took the big songs and (Adam) Cooper and (Suzanne) Shaw the dazzling dance routines. The former were in good voice and it was well worth the trip to Salford just to see the sublime I Love a Piano tap routine by a flying Cooper and Shaw".

Emmerdale
Shaw appeared as Eve Birch, the granddaughter of longstanding character Edna Birch, in the British ITV1 soap Emmerdale.
The character first appeared on the show in 2001 originally played by Raine Davison, where she remained a series regular until her departure in 2002. Eve returned to the show briefly in October 2006 when she married James Jenson.
In January 2010 it was announced that Eve would be returning to the show after nearly a four-year absence with the part being recast. Series producer Gavin Blyth stated in an interview with Digital Spy that he auditioned 50 to 60 actresses for the role, one of them being former Hear'Say singer and West end star Shaw who made the trip to Yorkshire to audition from Manchester where she was playing Judy Haynes in the record breaking musical White Christmas. The decision to cast Shaw was announced on 29 January. Her original contract was for a year and she made her debut on 2 April 2010. In April 2011 it was announced Shaw would quit Emmerdale with her character later leaving onscreen in August 2011.

Funny Peculiar
In 2012, Shaw toured in Funny Peculiar with Vicky Entwistle, Craig Gazey, Dominic Cazenove and Gemma Bissix.

Suzanne is also a regular in pantomime.

Personal life
Shaw started a relationship with DJ and television presenter Jason King. The couple had been friends since Shaw's Hear'Say days, but began dating in December 2005 after appearing together on Britain's Worst Celebrity Driver. The couple lived together with Shaw's son in Oxenhope in Yorkshire next door to Andy Bell. They announced their engagement in August 2008 and the couple wed in Christchurch, Dorset, in June 2009.

On 13 February 2012, it was announced that the couple had separated.

In 2008, Shaw was voted Celebrity Mother of the Year by the public. Following her marriage Shaw took some time off to support her new husband and to dedicate herself to family life. Shaw also said that she prefers quiet family life and goes out of her way to avoid the press and a showbiz lifestyle.

Shaw gave birth to her first child, a boy named Corey MacKenzie Shaw-Day, on 16 December 2004. Corey's father is actor and singer Darren Day. On 4 March 2015, Shaw announced that she was expecting a second child, with fiancé Sam Greenfield. Shaw gave birth to a boy on 6 October 2015 whom she named Rafferty.

References

External links 
 
 

1981 births
English soap opera actresses
English stage actresses
English television actresses
Living people
People from Bury, Greater Manchester
Popstars winners
21st-century English women singers
21st-century English singers